Rudravaram is a village in Achampeta mandal, Guntur district, Andhra Pradesh, India.

Geography
It has an average elevation of 198 meters (652 feet).

References

Villages in Guntur district